Numerous postage stamps from various countries have released postage stamps depicting scenes and images from the comic book series Asterix by Goscinny and Uderzo.

List of stamps

Guernsey, 1992
A series of six stamps depicting various naval scenes from the adventures.

France, 1999
A single stamp and a minisheet showing Asterix.

Belgium, 2005
A set of six stamps, five showing characters, and the sixth showing a scene from the book Asterix in Belgium.

Tadjikistan, 2001
A Block of nine stamps, showing motifs from the books

Tadjikistan, 2002
A block of nine stamps, showing 7 motifs from "Looney Toons" and 2 motifs from the "Asterix" books

Kyrgyzstan, 2001
A block of Film-motifs (Famous Movies), one of them showing Obelix

See also
 Tintin postage stamps

External links
 Belgian Post 2005 stamps about Asterix

Postage Stamps
Topical postage stamps